Paradiadelia is a genus of longhorn beetles of the subfamily Lamiinae, containing the following species:

subgenus Obliquediadelia
 Paradiadelia mediofusca Breuning, 1957
 Paradiadelia rufotarsalis Breuning, 1957
 Paradiadelia tigrinata Breuning, 1975

subgenus Paradiadelia
 Paradiadelia bispinosa Breuning, 1940

References

Desmiphorini